Parotis ogasawarensis is a moth in the family Crambidae. It was described by Shibuya in 1929. It is found in Japan, where it has been recorded from the Bonin Islands.

References

Moths described in 1929
Spilomelinae